Mustafić is a patronymic Bosnian surname. People with the name include:
 Alen Mustafić (born 1999), Bosnian footballer
 Fahrudin Mustafić (born 1981), Singapore footballer of Bosnian descent
 Ibran Mustafić (born 1960), Bosnian politician
 Muhamed Mustafić (born 1981), Bosnian handballer

References

Bosnian surnames
Patronymic surnames
Surnames from given names